God Is in the House is a live concert DVD by Nick Cave and the Bad Seeds, released on 26 August 2003.

Track listing 

 "Do You Love Me?"
 "Oh My Lord"
 "Lime Tree Arbour"
 "Red Right Hand"
 "As I Sat Sadly By Your Side"
 "The Weeping Song"
 "God Is In The House"
 "We Came Along This Road"
 "Papa Won’t Leave You, Henry"
 "Hallelujah"
 "The Mercy Seat"
 "Into My Arms"
 "Saint Huck"
 "The Curse Of Millhaven"
 "No More Shall We Part – The Recording Sessions"
 "As I Sat Sadly By Your Side"
 "Fifteen Feet Of Pure White Snow"
 "Love Letter"

Personnel 

 Martyn P. Casey - Bass
 Thomas Wydler - Drums
 Blixa Bargeld Guitar, vocals
 Mick Harvey - Guitar, vocals
 Conway Savage - Keyboards, vocals
 Jim Sclavunos - Percussion, organ
 Warren Ellis - Violin
 Nick Cave - Vocals, piano

References

2003 live albums
2003 video albums
Live video albums
Nick Cave live albums